I'm Going Away is an album by The Fiery Furnaces.
	
I'm Going Away may also refer to:

"I'm Going Away" (How to Get Away with Murder episode), an episode of the legal drama How to Get Away with Murder
"I'm Going Away", a 1976 single by  Mahogany Rush, Marino from Mahogany Rush IV 
"I'm Going Away", a song by The Stomachmouths
"I'm Going Away", a song by The Greenhornes from East Grand Blues (also released as Pattern Skies)  EP 
I'm Going Away, a 1950 Arabic-language novel by Yusuf Sibai and the Egyptian film adaptation